Amedeo Mangone (born 12 July 1968 in Milan) is an Italian association football coach and former player, who played as a defender. He currently serves as head coach of Italian amateur club Villa Valle.

Playing career
A product of A.C. Milan's youth system, he was transferred in 1987 to Pergocrema of Serie C2. In 1989, he moved to Solbiatese, another Serie C2 club; he left the club 1993 to join Serie B club Bari, being one of the protagonists of the gallettis promotion to Serie A. In 1996, he moved to Bologna, and to Roma three years later, for 13 billion lire. In 2001–02 he joined Parma (in a swap deal, Mangone, Sergei Gurenko and Paolo Poggi to Parma; Diego Fuser, Saliou Lassissi and Raffaele Longo to Roma) and then spent periods at Brescia and Piacenza, ending his career in 2005.

Coaching career
In 2007, he was appointed head coach of Pavia in Serie C2. In June 2010 he was announced as new head coach of Lega Pro Prima Divisione club Reggiana. On 22 December 2011 he was sacked.

He then served as head coach of Brazilian club Gama for a total seven games between December 2015 and March 2016, being fired due to visa-related issues.

In March 2019 he was appointed coach of Milan-based amateurs Brera until the end of the season.

On 22 February 2022, he was hired as head coach of Serie D relegation-struggling club Villa Valle. After saving his club from relegation through playoffs, Mangone was successively confirmed as the club's head coach also for the 2022–23 season.

Honours
ClubBolognaUEFA Intertoto Cup: 1998Roma'
Serie A: 2000–01

References

External links
Profile at Lega-Calcio.it

1968 births
Living people
Footballers from Milan
Italian footballers
U.S. Pergolettese 1932 players
S.S.C. Bari players
Bologna F.C. 1909 players
A.S. Roma players
Parma Calcio 1913 players
Brescia Calcio players
Piacenza Calcio 1919 players
U.S. Catanzaro 1929 players
A.S.D. SolbiaSommese Calcio players
Serie A players
Serie B players
Sociedade Esportiva do Gama managers
Association football defenders
Italian football managers